General elections were held in Fiji between 4 and 11 April 1987. They marked the first electoral transition of power in Fijian history. Despite receiving just under 50% of the vote, the Alliance Party of longtime Prime Minister, Kamisese Mara was defeated by a coalition of the Fiji Labour Party (contesting a general election for the first time) and National Federation Party, which won 28 seats to the Alliance's 24. The Labour Party's Timoci Bavadra became Prime Minister.

Bavadra's 28-member parliamentary caucus included only seven ethnic Fijians, all of them elected with predominantly Indo-Fijian support from national constituencies. His fourteen-member cabinet included six Fijians, seven Indo-Fijians and one European. Effective Indo-Fijian control of the government caused widespread resentment among the ethnic Fijian community, and after less than a month in office, the new government was deposed on 14 May in a coup d'état led by Lieutenant-Colonel Sitiveni Rabuka.

Electoral system
The 52 members of the House of Representatives were elected from two types of constituency, with candidature in each limited to one of three ethnic groups; Fijians, Indo-Fijians and General electors, generally of European or Chinese descent.

Twenty-seven members were elected from communal constituencies (12 Fijians, 12 Indo-Fijians and 3 general) in which voters voted for someone of their own ethnicity, with the remaining twenty-five elected from national constituencies (10 Fijian, 10 Indo-Fijian and 5 general) in which candidature was limited by ethnicity but all registered voters in a constituency could vote for.

Results

Aftermath
Following the elections Bavadra formed a fourteen member cabinet.

See also
List of members of the Parliament of Fiji (1987)

References

Elections in Fiji
General
Fiji
Fiji